Zhenina Trashileva (Bulgarian: Женина Трашлиева; born 14 April 1997) is a Bulgarian rhythmic gymnast. She is world champion in All-Around with the Bulgarian team and world champion in the final with 3 ribbons+2 balls in 2022 World Championships. She won gold in the senior team competition at the 2022 European Championships.

Career 
Trashileva had been part of the Bulgarian national team competing internationally since 2012, including the 2012 junior European Championships.

In 2013 she was invited to integrate the senior individuals by the national coordinator, Efrosina Angelova. Zhenina competed mainly nationally, not managing to breakthrough the national ranking. In 2015 Trashileva had a fallout with Angelova, causing her expulsion from the national team, the motivation given was "a systematic violation of discipline, non-compliance with the instructions of the coaches and the creation of an unfavorable atmosphere, which interferes with the normal course of the training process."

However a year later, in July 2016, Zhenina was invited to take part in the national group selection for the 2017-2020 Olympic cycle. She was made a reserve and continued to compete individually in Bulgaria and also in Italy under the team "Evoluzione Danza".

In 2022, when the girls of the previous group retired after becoming Olympic champions, she became a starter in the two routines. Her first competition was the Grand Prix in Marbella, Spain. The group then took part in the World Cup stages in Sofia (All-Around and 5 hoops gold, silver with 3 ribbons + 2 balls), Tashkent (All-Around and 5 hoops gold, bronze with 3 ribbons + 2 balls), Pesaro (All-Around and  3 ribbons + 2 balls silver and 5 hoops bronze), Pamplona (bronze with 5 hoops and silver with  3 ribbons + 2 balls) and Cluji-Napoca (All-Around, 5 hoops and 3 ribbons + 2 balls gold). In June she was part of the group for the European Championship in Tel Aviv, she won gold in the senior team category along with Vaya Draganova, Sofia Ivanova, Kamelia Petrova, Rachel Stoyanov, Margarita Vasileva and the individuals Boryana Kaleyn and Stiliana Nikolova.

References 

 

1997 births
Living people
Bulgarian rhythmic gymnasts
Medalists at the Rhythmic Gymnastics European Championships
Medalists at the Rhythmic Gymnastics World Championships